Joaquim Devanir Ferreira do Carmo (born 1 July 1970), known as King or  Devanir King, is a Brazilian former footballer who played as a centre back.

Career
Born in São Paulo, King joined S.C. Braga in the Portuguese first tier in 1992. He made his debut on 13 September 1992, in an away loss to S.C. Farense, adding 11 more league appearances in his first season. His second year was his breakthrough season, amassing 30 league caps, alongside either Jorge Ferreira or Sérgio Abreu.

In 1994, King moved to Farense, where he made nearly 30 league games in his first year, partnering with Jorge Soares in the defence of Paco Fortes team. Only a year after arriving in Faro, he made a surprise move to S.L. Benfica on a loan deal from Farense. He appeared in only one game, on 12 September 1995, in a 1–3 win against Lierse S.K. for the 1995–96 UEFA Cup.

After Benfica, he moved to LB Châteauroux, playing six months in the French second tier. In December 1996, the 26-year-old was signed by Atlético Madrid, being immediately assigned to their B-team, competing in the 1996–97 Segunda División. He debuted on 11 January 1997, in an away win against Real Madrid Castilla, for a total of 20 league appearances in his debut year. His second year in Madrid was not so successful, so he moved back to Farense in 1998, reuniting with Paco Fortes.

He resumed regular competition, playing 25 games in the starting eleven in his return year, but faced much more serious competition in his second, acting mainly a bench player.

Released by Farense, he spent one year without competing, practising at SJPF (Syndicate of Professional Football Players), with unemployed players. The 31-year-old later signed with Algeciras CF in 2001, playing 18 games in the third tier of Spanish football.

A year later, King moved to Greek football, joining Ionikos in the top tier, remaining there for four years, with nearly 100 league caps. He retired in 2009, after three seasons in the lower divisions, assuming an assistant position at Panathinaikos F.C. in 2012. He later quit his post and joined Veria F.C. staff, as assistant and translator for Ton Caanen, where he still remains.

References

External links
 
 

1970 births
Living people
Footballers from São Paulo
Brazilian footballers
S.C. Braga players
S.C. Farense players
S.L. Benfica footballers
LB Châteauroux players
Atlético Madrid B players
Algeciras CF footballers
Ionikos F.C. players
Veria F.C. players
Kavala F.C. players
Primeira Liga players
Ligue 2 players
Segunda División players
Segunda División B players
Super League Greece players
Brazilian expatriate footballers
Expatriate footballers in Portugal
Brazilian expatriate sportspeople in Portugal
Expatriate footballers in France
Brazilian expatriate sportspeople in France
Expatriate footballers in Spain
Brazilian expatriate sportspeople in Spain
Expatriate footballers in Greece
Brazilian expatriate sportspeople in Greece
Association football defenders